Jean-Pascal is a French masculine given name. Notable people with the name include:

 Jean-Pascal Beintus (born 1966), French composer
 Jean-Pascal Chaigne (born 1977), French composer of mainly chamber works
 Jean-Pascal Delamuraz (1936–1998), Swiss politician
 Jean-Pascal Fontaine (born 1989), French football midfielder
 Jean-Pascal Lacoste (born 1978), French singer, actor and TV host
 Jean-Pascal Mignot (born 1981), French football player
 Jean-Pascal van Ypersele (born 1957), Belgian Professor of Climatology and Environmental Sciences

See also 
 Jean Pascal (born 1982), Haitian-Canadian boxer

French masculine given names
Compound given names